The Himalayan vulture (Gyps himalayensis) or Himalayan griffon vulture is an Old World vulture native to the Himalayas and the adjoining Tibetan Plateau. It is one of the two largest Old World vultures and true raptors. It is listed as Near Threatened on the IUCN Red List. It is not to be confused with the Eurasian griffon vulture (Gyps fulvus), which is a similar and sympatric species.

Description

The Himalayan vulture has dark brown greater covert feathers, tail and wing quills, but a pale buff uniform upperside and paler tipped inner secondaries; its legs are covered with buffy feathers and vary in colour from greenish grey to pale brown. The underside and under-wing coverts are pale brown or buff, almost white in some individuals. The whitish down on the head of immatures changes to yellowish in adults who have a long and pale brown ruff with white streaks and long and spiky ruff feathers.

The pale blue facial skin is lighter than the dark blue in Gyps fulvus with this species having a yellowish bill. In flight the long fingers are splayed and there is a pale patagial stripe on the underwing. The wing and tail feathers are dark and contrast with the pale coverts and body, one of the best methods to distinguish this species from the slightly smaller griffon vulture. The feathers on the body have pale shaft streaks.

It is the largest of the Gyps species, averaging larger in every method of measurement than its relatives, and is perhaps the largest and heaviest bird in the Himalayas.

It differs from the similar-coloured Indian vulture (G. indicus) by a stouter, more robust bill; younger birds have a pale bill and tend to have buffy-white streaks on the scapulars and wing coverts contrasting with dark brown underparts. It is similar in size to the cinereous vulture (Aegypius monachus), which typically has a slightly shorter overall length but can weigh more than the Himalayan vulture.

Distribution

It is distributed from Kazakhstan, Uzbekistan, Kyrgyzstan, Tajikistan, Afghanistan and Iran to Pakistan to India, Nepal, Bhutan to western China and Mongolia. Juvenile birds may however disperse further south, and vagrants have been recorded in Thailand, Burma, Singapore and Cambodia.

Behaviour and ecology

Diet
The Himalayan vulture perches on crags, favourite sites showing white marks from regular defecation. Himalayan vultures often bask in the sun on rocks. They soar in thermals and are not capable of sustained flapping flight. Flocks may follow grazers up the mountains in their search for dead animals. This vulture makes a rattling sound when descending on a carcass and can grunt or hiss at roosts or when feeding on carrion. While feeding, individuals may make cackling sounds to defend their food from other vultures or even reprimand them. They are social birds, and are hence found in large flocks, while even being accompanied by crows (observed with other vulture species as well). Such crows cannot interfere with the flocks (as vultures are physically larger and stronger than crows), but vehicular traffic, human interference, and attacks from herding dogs can pose a disturbance. They have been recorded eating carrion exclusively, some which is fed on even when putrid. On the Tibetan Plateau 64% of their diet is obtained from dead domestic yak (Bos grunniens). They feed on old carcasses sometimes waiting a couple of days near a dead animal. They disdain offal, which is readily eaten by other vultures, and instead typically eat only fleshy parts. Historically, Himalayan vultures regularly fed on human corpses left out on Celestial burial grounds. This species is fairly contentious around other scavengers and typically dominates other meat-eaters at carrion, though is subservient to gray wolves (Canis lupus), snow leopards (Panthera uncia) and cinereous vultures (Aegypius monachus) at carcasses. In a large party, these vultures can reportedly strip a human or sheep carcass of all meat in 30 minutes and do the same to a yak carcass in roughly 120 minutes. Himalayan vultures have been observed feeding on pine (Pinus roxburghii) needles, an unexplained behaviour that cannot be for obtaining nutrition.

Breeding
The breeding season begins in January. The nest is a platform of sticks placed on an inaccessible ledge on a cliff. Several pairs may nest on the same cliff face, with between five and seven pairs being a typical colony size. The nests are relatively small for the large size of these birds and, although grow larger with repeated uses, do not generally get as massive as the nest of other large accipitrids. There is at least one recorded instance of Himalayan vultures using a nest made by bearded vultures (Gypaetus barbatus). On the Tibetan Plateau, Himalayan and bearded vultures were observed nesting in close proximity without conflict, which is notable because in several other cases of adjacent interspecies nesting by Old World vultures (including some involving bearded vultures) have resulted in high aggression and interspecies attacks. A single white egg marked with red splotches is the usual clutch. Egg laying dates in northern India have ranged from December 25 to March 7. In captivity the incubation period was about 54–58 days. The young birds stay on with the parents for six to seven months.

Threats

Himalayan vultures are susceptible to toxicity induced by diclofenac, a drug whose residues in domestic animal carcasses has led to rapid declines in populations of other Gyps vultures across Asia. The Himalayan griffon vulture populations have however not shown signs of rapid decline, although reductions in nesting birds have been noted in some parts of its range in Nepal.

References

External links 

 Himalayan griffon vulture videos. The Internet Bird Collection

Himalayan vulture
Himalayan vulture
Birds of the Himalayas
Birds of Tibet
Himalayan vulture
Himalayan vulture